Xingping is a city located in the center part of Shaanxi province, China. It has been a city since 1993, with a total area of 496 square kilometers and a population of 620,000. At present, Xingping has developed more than 50 industries including maritime, aviation, electronics, medicine, and light industry. 
The old banyan tree, which needs as many as eight people's outstretched arms to encircle it, and Guandi (General Guan Yu) Temple which was built during the Qing dynasty both tell the long history of the town.
Other places of interest in the city includes the tomb of Han Maoling, Huo Yang's tomb and Xingping's North Tower.

Liu Jin (also known as Liu Chin), born circa 1451 or 1452, is from the area of Xingping (Hsing-p’ing). A son of T’an lineage, when he was made a eunuch under the aegis of a eunuch official named Liu, he appropriated that surname. Infamous for being an extremely corrupt official who abused his office to amass a great fortune, he was executed in Beijing in 1510 for treason by a "thousand cuts" over a three-day period. He died on the 2nd day after 300 to 400 cuts. Witnesses at the time said that angry onlookers bought a piece of his flesh for one qian (the smallest currency at the time) and consumed it with rice wine.

Administrative divisions
As 2016, this city is divided to 5 subdistricts and 7 towns.
Subdistricts

Towns

Climate

References

External links 

Cities in Shaanxi
County-level divisions of Shaanxi
Xianyang